Jennifer P. Dougherty (born April 13, 1961) was elected Frederick, Maryland's first female mayor in 2001. Dougherty defeated 2-term incumbent Republican Mayor James S. Grimes.

Dougherty campaigned for re-election in 2005 but did not win the Democratic primary, losing to opponent Ron Young.  Dougherty and Young both ran bitter, negative campaigns in which each attacked the other.

Dougherty was the Democratic nominee for Maryland's 6th congressional district in 2008.

Early life and education
Dougherty graduated from Georgetown Visitation Preparatory School in Washington, D.C. She later graduated from Mount Saint Mary's University in 1983 with a BA in History, magna cum laude. While a student at The Mount, Dougherty was a 4-year varsity field hockey player. She is the only person in The Mount's Athletic Hall of Fame honored for field hockey. Dougherty also wrote for The Mountain Echo, The Mount's official campus-wide newspaper, for 4 years, serving as editor-in-chief in her senior year.

Career
Dougherty operated Jennifer's Restaurant on West Patrick Street (opened 1987; closed 2008) and Dougherty's Irish Shop (1999–2006). She also served on the Board of Directors of Heartly House, the Frederick County Chamber of Commerce President (1999), and Rotary Club of Carroll Creek.  More recently in December 2009, Dougherty and partner Bruce Rhoderick opened Magoo's Pub and Eatery on West Second Street in Frederick.

Mayor of Frederick
Dougherty's tenure in Frederick's City Hall was marked by accomplishments and challenges. The focus on improving the relationship with the Frederick Police Department by hiring Chief of Police, Kim C. Dine, strengthened the community support for the police. Her tenure was marked with inciting divisiveness among her fellow politicians. A strong proponent of unions, she fought hard behind the scenes to get city workers to unionize. The workers finally voted against this initiative, and the labor support of Dougherty waned.

The creation of the Neighborhood Advisory Councils to better serve each neighborhood established a more effective communication link for the residents. Many saw her Neighborhood Advisory Committees (NACs) as a way to pander to select, influential neighborhood members who then fostered votes on her behalf. The city had resisted speed bumps for years, at the request of fire and rescue professionals. Speed bumps became commonplace in neighborhoods where there were NACs supportive to Dougherty.

During her tenure, the city faced serious water shortages due to decades of growth and poor management of water and sewer infrastructure. Innovative legislation created a process to track and allocate water to new development in the city. A million-dollar temporary, mobile water treatment plant was installed that never was able to produce potable water. The water produced created plumbing problems for surrounding neighborhoods.

The long-stalled Carroll Creek Linear Park was finally completed with the investment of public effort and investment. With the completion of the public improvements, the city sought private investment of more than $100 million in the first phase bringing needed tax revenue to the city.

The Dougherty Administration also addressed aging infrastructure by creating an incentive for mall owners to improve their properties. The Golden Mile Tax Credit District resulted in more than $50 million in private investment and 1000 new jobs.  Dougherty was diversified in her hiring, placing more women in high positions.  After a failed re-election bid Dougherty went to work for the mother of one of her previous subordinates in real estate.

Congressional campaign
On November 19, 2007, Dougherty filed to run for Maryland's 6th congressional district. She won the primary and was the Democratic candidate for congress in 2008 against 8-term Republican Roscoe Bartlett. Bartlett defeated Dougherty in the general election.

Subsequent mayoral campaigns
Dougherty announced in 2009 that she would again seek the office of mayor of the City of Frederick, but lost in the primary to newcomer Jason Judd.  Dougherty has remained visible in Frederick politics and has recently filed a bid for the 2017 mayoral election.

In 2013, Jennifer Dougherty announced that she was running for mayor of Frederick as an independent candidate.  The election was held on November 5.  Dougherty lost, garnering 19.43 percent of the vote to Democratic nominee Karen Young's 31.59 percent and incumbent Republican Mayor Randy McClement's 48.75 percent.

Electoral history

! bgcolor=#cccccc |Year
! bgcolor=#cccccc |Office
! bgcolor=#cccccc |Election
!
! bgcolor=#cccccc |Winner
! bgcolor=#cccccc |Party
! bgcolor=#cccccc |Votes
! bgcolor=#cccccc |%
!
! bgcolor=#cccccc |Opponent
! bgcolor=#cccccc |Party
! bgcolor=#cccccc |Votes
! bgcolor=#cccccc |%
!
! bgcolor=#cccccc |Opponent
! bgcolor=#cccccc |Party
! bgcolor=#cccccc |Votes
! bgcolor=#cccccc |%
|-
| 2008
| Congress, 6th district
| General
||
| bgcolor=#FFE8E8 |Roscoe Bartlett
| bgcolor=#FFE8E8 |Republican
| bgcolor=#FFE8E8 |176,062
| bgcolor=#FFE8E8 |58.18
|
| bgcolor=#DDEEFF |Jennifer Dougherty
| bgcolor=#DDEEFF |Democratic
| bgcolor=#DDEEFF |116,455
| bgcolor=#DDEEFF |38.48
|
| bgcolor=#9DFF9D |Gary Hoover
| bgcolor=#9DFF9D |Libertarian
| bgcolor=#9DFF9D |10,101
| bgcolor=#9DFF9D |3.34
|-
| 2009
| Mayor of Frederick, Maryland
| Primary
||
| bgcolor=#FFE8E8 |Jason Judd
| bgcolor=#FFE8E8 |Democratic
| bgcolor=#FFE8E8 |1,672
| bgcolor=#FFE8E8 |58.65
|
| bgcolor=#DDEEFF |Jennifer Dougherty
| bgcolor=#DDEEFF |Democratic
| bgcolor=#DDEEFF |1003
| bgcolor=#DDEEFF |35.18
|
| bgcolor=#9DFF9D |Chris Simpson
| bgcolor=#9DFF9D |Democratic
| bgcolor=#9DFF9D |176
| bgcolor=#9DFF9D |6.17
|-
| 2013
| Mayor of Frederick, Maryland
| General
||
| bgcolor=#FFE8E8 |Randy McClement
| bgcolor=#FFE8E8 |Republican
| bgcolor=#FFE8E8 |3,714
| bgcolor=#FFE8E8 |48.75
|
| bgcolor=#DDEEFF |Karen Young
| bgcolor=#DDEEFF |Democratic
| bgcolor=#DDEEFF |2,407
| bgcolor=#DDEEFF |31.59
|
| bgcolor=#9DFF9D |Jennifer Dougherty
| bgcolor=#9DFF9D |Unaffiliated
| bgcolor=#9DFF9D |1,480
| bgcolor=#9DFF9D |19.43

References

External links
2008 campaign site

1961 births
Living people
Georgetown Visitation Preparatory School alumni
Politicians from Alexandria, Virginia
Women mayors of places in Maryland
Mount St. Mary's University alumni
Women in Maryland politics
Mayors of Frederick, Maryland
Maryland Democrats
Candidates in the 2008 United States elections
21st-century American politicians
21st-century American women politicians